The Soviet Union's 1958 nuclear test series was a group of 36 nuclear tests conducted in 1958. These tests followed the 1957 Soviet nuclear tests series and preceded the 1961 Soviet nuclear tests series.

References

1958
1958 in the Soviet Union
1958 in military history
Explosions in 1958